Melanoides pergracilis  is a species of freshwater snail with a gill and an operculum, an aquatic gastropod mollusk in the family Thiaridae.

This species is endemic to Lake Malawi. Its natural habitat is freshwater lakes.

The IUCN Red List of Threatened Species treats the species as a synonym of Melanoides polymorpha

References

Fauna of Lake Malawi
Invertebrates of Malawi
Invertebrates of Mozambique
Invertebrates of Tanzania
Thiaridae
Freshwater snails of Africa
Gastropods described in 1897
Taxa named by Eduard von Martens
Taxonomy articles created by Polbot
Taxobox binomials not recognized by IUCN